Jiří Novák was the defending champion but lost in the quarterfinals to Potito Starace.

Roger Federer won in the final 6–2, 6–3, 5–7, 6–3 against Igor Andreev.

Seeds
A champion seed is indicated in bold while text in italics indicates the round in which that seed was eliminated.

Draw

 NB: The Final was the best of 5 sets while all other rounds were the best of 3 sets.

Final

Section 1

Section 2

References
 2004 Allianz Suisse Open Gstaad Draw

Swiss Open (tennis)
2004 ATP Tour
2004 Allianz Suisse Open Gstaad